Postage was released in 2003 as an in depth synopsis of Supergroove's output.  Whilst it is the band's Greatest Hits collection there were a number of songs on the album, predominantly from singles, which had not been previously released on any of the band's earlier albums and EPs.  Noticeable inclusions are "Sex Police", "Here Comes The Supergroove" and a new remix by New Zealand Hip Hop producer P-Money.

The original 2003 release included a second disc of remixed tracks and live recordings of some of their most well known songs during their mid 1990s peak. This was deleted the following year and replaced with an abbreviated single disc version.

When the band reformed in 2007 initially to support Crowded House and then for their own tours in 2008 a third version of the album was released with revised packaging and track listing as well as a new bonus disc, a DVD containing 11 of the band's music videos.

Track listing

Original 2003 Release

CD 1
Here Comes The Supergroove
You Gotta Know
Let The Funk Be Free
Soul Time Strikes Back
Scorpio Girls
Come To The Party
"Can't Get Enough"
Sex Police
Backspaced
Sitting Inside My Head
Five Word Headline
You Freak Me
Sister Sister
If I Had My Way
For Whatever Remix
Missionary Man
Next Time
5th Wheel

CD 2
Scorpio Girls [P-Money's Khyber Block Party Mix]
Can't Get Enough [Baitercell vs Timmy Schumacher Radio Booom Shwack Mix]
Scorpio Girls [Baitercell vs Timmy Schumacher Malaysian Stadium Rock Mix]
Can't Get Enough [Baitercell vs Timmy Schumacher Club Booom Shwack Mix]
You Gotta Know [live in Australia 1995]
You Freak Me [live in Australia 1995]
Next Time [live in Holland 1995]

2004 Single Disc Release

Here Comes The Supergroove
You Gotta Know
Let The Funk Be Free
Soul Time Strikes Back
Scorpio Girls
Come To The Party
"Can't Get Enough"
Sex Police
Sitting Inside My Head
Five Word Headline
You Freak Me
Sister Sister
If I Had My Way
For Whatever Remix
Next Time
5th Wheel
Scorpio Girls [P-Money's Khyber Block Party Mix]
Can't Get Enough [Baitercell vs Timmy Schumacher Radio Boom Shwack Mix]
Scorpio Girls [Baitercell vs Timmy Shumacher Malaysian Stadium Rock Mix]

2007 Tour Edition

CD
Here Comes The Supergroove
You Gotta Know
Let The Funk Be Free
Soul Time Strikes Back
Scorpio Girls
Come To The Party
"Can't Get Enough"
Sex Police
Sitting Inside My Head
Five Word Headline
You Freak Me
Sister Sister
If I Had My Way
For Whatever Remix
Next Time
5th Wheel
You Gotta Know [live in Australia 1995]
You Freak Me [live in Australia 1995]
Next Time [live in Holland 1995]

Bonus DVD (video clips)
Here Comes The Supergroove
You Gotta Know
Scorpio Girls
"Can't Get Enough"
Sitting Inside My Head
You Freak Me
You Gotta Know [international version]
Next Time
If I Had My Way
5th Wheel
For Whatever Remix

References
[ Postage on allmusicguide]
Amplifier article on Supergroove

Supergroove albums
2003 greatest hits albums
2003 video albums
Music video compilation albums